David John Russell  (born July 29, 1931) is a retired politician from Alberta, Canada.

Born in Calgary in 1931, Russell was elected to Calgary City Council and served as Alderman from 1960–1961 and then again from 1963 to 1967.

Russell was first elected to the Legislative Assembly of Alberta as a Progressive Conservative member in the 1967 Alberta general election for Calgary Victoria Park. Russell served one term as the member for that riding as a member for the Progressive Conservative opposition under Peter Lougheed.
In the 1971 Alberta general election Russell was re-elected as the member for the new district of Calgary Elbow. The Progressive Conservative party formed the government in that election. Russell served 5 terms as the member for the riding and retired in 1989.

Russell served as Deputy Premier from 1986-1989.

References

External links
City of Calgary Aldermanic biography Page 148

1931 births
Calgary city councillors
Living people
Progressive Conservative Association of Alberta MLAs
Members of the Executive Council of Alberta